Don't Just Lie There, Say Something! is a 1974 British politically-themed comedy film based on a popular "Whitehall farce" written by Michael Pertwee, who also wrote the screenplay.

In the film, a government minister and his best friend take action in parliament against permissive behaviour in the United Kingdom. They are opposed by a group of hippies, who try to discredit them. Meanwhile the minister is trying to maintain sexual relations with two different women, while keeping his sexual life hidden from the public.

Plot summary
Sir William Mainwaring-Brown, a British Government Minister, puts forward a parliamentary Bill to battle 'filth' (permissive behaviour) in the UK. However, that does not stop him having an affair with Wendy (the wife of a high-up reporter)—as well as planning a one-night-stand with his secretary Miss Parkyn, having discovered that her boyfriend has gone away. Opponents of the Bill – mainly some hippies, led by Johnny – decide to kidnap the Minister's best friend and co-sponsor of the Bill, Barry Ovis, just as he is on the way to the church to marry his fiancée, Jean.

The intention is to discredit Barry Ovis by making it appear that he was involved in an orgy, thus removing any credibility that the Law and Order Bill might have had. Following a tip-off by Edith, one of the conspirators, the police raid the hippies' flat. Thankfully for Barry, he escapes before the police discover him and dashes back to Sir William's flat, followed by Edith.

Meanwhile, the Minister is also trying to use the flat to carry on his seduction of Miss Parkyn, only for Wendy to also appear by surprise. The Minister, Barry and Jean try to keep the truth from Inspector Ruff (Who is searching for the missing Ovis), Wilfred Potts (an elderly anti-sleaze MP, who is staying temporarily in the adjoining flat) and Birdie (the Minister's wife). Not only that, but they have to try to deal with the hippies who do their utmost to discredit Mainwaring-Brown and Ovis. Naturally this causes no end of trouble.

Cast
 Brian Rix as Barry Ovis
 Leslie Phillips as Sir William Mainwaring-Brown
 Joan Sims as Lady 'Birdie' Mainwaring-Brown
 Joanna Lumley as Giselle Parkyn
 Derek Royle as Wilfred Potts
 Myra Frances as Jean
 Katy Manning as Damina
 Peter Bland as Inspector Ruff
 Anita Graham as Wendy
 Barrie Gosney as Police Sergeant
 Derek Griffiths as Johnny
 Corbet Woodall as TV newsreader
 David Battley as Country Yokel
 Gabrielle Daye as Elderly lady
 Diane Langton as Angie
 Aubrey Woods as TV chairman

Reception
Halliwell's Film Guide gave the film a negative review, saying it was a "stupefying from-the-stalls rendering of a successful stage farce; in this form it simply doesn't work". Radio Times was similarly scathing, stating the film "reduces the precise timing of the double entendres, the bedroom entrances and exits and the dropped-trouser misunderstandings to the level of clumsy contrivance, which not even the slickest of players can redeem".

Television
The film was spun off into a sitcom titled Men of Affairs for ITV. Leslie Phillips was unavailable to reprise his role as William Mainwaring-Brown; the part went to Warren Mitchell, who had found lasting fame as Alf Garnett.

See also
No Sex Please, We're British

References

External links

1974 films
1974 comedy films
1970s political comedy films
Films directed by Bob Kellett
British political comedy films
Films scored by Peter Greenwell
Adultery in films
Hippie films
Films adapted into television shows
1970s British films